Tieman is a name of Dutch origin, a variant spelling of the name Tiedeman which again is a variant spelling of the name Tiedemann. Notable people with the name include:

 Brian Tieman, astronomer who confirmed the existence of SN 2010lt with John B. Newman in 2011
 Bron Tieman, programmer and lyricist for Little Bitch
 Dan Tieman, basketball player
 James Tieman, runner-up in the 1990 Non-Life Master Swiss Teams
 Johan Tieman, navigator of KLM Flight 633
 Joshua Tieman, a poker player
 , the Minister of Foreign Affairs and International Cooperation in Council of Ministers of Mali from 2012 on
 Will Tieman, owner of WGHN

See also

References 

Dutch given names
Dutch-language surnames